José García Ortíz (24 March 1949 – 26 June 2012) was a Mexican politician affiliated with the Institutional Revolutionary Party. He served as Deputy of the LIX Legislature of the Mexican Congress as a plurinominal representative.

References

1949 births
2012 deaths
Politicians from Guadalajara, Jalisco
Members of the Chamber of Deputies (Mexico)
Institutional Revolutionary Party politicians
Deputies of the LIX Legislature of Mexico